Wilson Garden is a neighbourhood in the central part of Bangalore, India. It is surrounded by Lal Bagh, Jayanagara, Adugodi and Sudhama Nagara. Among the landmarks located in/near the locality are Atal Bihari Vajpayee TTMC, NIMHANS and Lakkasandra Lake.

References

External links

Neighbourhoods in Bangalore